The 2009 Italian Formula Three Championship was the 45th Italian Formula Three Championship season. It began on May 9, 2009 in Adria and ended on October 18 in Monza. Italian driver Daniel Zampieri won the title at the last round in Monza. Zampieri also sealed the Rookie Cup title during the same race.

Teams and drivers
 All cars were powered by FPT engines, all teams were Italian-registered.

Calendar
All rounds were held in Italy.

Standings
Points are awarded as follows:

Rookie

References

External links
 Official Website

Italian Formula Three Championship seasons
Formula Three
Italian
Italian Formula 3 Championship